The football tournament at the 1975 Southeast Asian Peninsular Games was held from 9 September to 16 December 1975 in Thailand.

Teams

Tournament

Group stage

Group A

Group B

Knockout stage

Semi-finals

Bronze medal match

Gold medal match

Winners

References 
Southeast Asian Peninsular Games 1975 at RSSSF
SEAP Games 1975 at AFF official website 

Southeast
Football at the Southeast Asian Games
1975
1975 in Thailand
Events at the 1975 Southeast Asian Peninsular Games